The Hunt–Morgan House, historically known as Hopemont, is a Federal style residence in Lexington, Kentucky built in 1814 by John Wesley Hunt, the first millionaire west of the Alleghenies. The house is included in the Gratz Park Historic District. The Alexander T. Hunt Civil War Museum is located on the second floor of the Hunt–Morgan House.

Other notable people who resided at Hopemont include John Wesley Hunt's great-grandson, Dr. Thomas Hunt Morgan. Born in the house in 1866, he became the first Kentuckian to win the Nobel Prize.
 
The House has many beautiful architectural features, including the Palladian window with fan and sidelights that grace its front façade. In 1955 the Blue Grass Trust for Historic Preservation was formed to save this home from impending demolition. The organization restored the home to its Federal appearance.

The Hunt–Morgan House is located on the corner of Mill and Second Streets, at 201 N. Mill Street, in Gratz Park in Lexington.

The Bluegrass Trust for Historic Preservation still maintains the Hunt-Morgan House. In addition to providing tours, they also host events, including art shows and weddings.

See also
John Hunt Morgan Memorial

References

External links

https://smileypete.com/community/creative-types-kayla-weber-nord/
https://www.bluegrasstrust.org/hopemont
Hunt–Morgan House, Lexington, Kentucky, at National Park Service

Houses completed in 1814
Federal architecture in Kentucky
Historic house museums in Kentucky
Lexington in the American Civil War
National Register of Historic Places in Lexington, Kentucky
Historic American Buildings Survey in Kentucky
American Civil War museums in Kentucky
Museums in Lexington, Kentucky
Houses on the National Register of Historic Places in Kentucky
Houses in Lexington, Kentucky
Historic district contributing properties in Kentucky
1814 establishments in Kentucky